Iván Ramiro Parra Pinto (born 14 October 1975 in Sogamoso) is a Colombian former road bicycle racer, who competed professionally for Petróleos de Colombia, Cafes Baque,  and . Parra comes from a Colombian cycling family. His father, Humberto was a successful in the Vuelta a Colombia, his eldest brother was the Colombian climber Fabio Parra who won stages in the Tour de France and the Vuelta a España in the 1980s. His other brother (named after his father) Humberto was also a professional cyclist for several years.

Parra started cycling as a mountain bike rider and was the Colombian national MTB champion in 1994. He represented Colombia internationally as a mountain biker but changed to road racing. In 1998 he came second in the Vuelta a Colombia. In 1999 he came to ride in the European peloton. In 2005 while riding for the UCI Professional Continental team , Parra won two back-to-back stages of the Giro d'Italia.

Career highlights

Major results

1998
 2nd Overall Vuelta a Colombia
1999
 9th Overall Vuelta a España
2000
 1st Stage 5 Volta a Galega
2004
 6th Overall Volta a Catalunya
 10th Overall Vuelta Ciclista de Chile
2005
 1st  Time trial, National Road Championships
 Giro d'Italia
1st Stages 13 & 14
2006
 1st  Mountains classification Tour de Romandie
2008
 8th Overall Vuelta a Colombia
2013
 4th Overall Vuelta a Colombia

Grand Tour general classification results timeline

References

External links 
 

1975 births
Living people
People from Sogamoso
Colombian male cyclists
Colombian Giro d'Italia stage winners
Cyclists at the 1999 Pan American Games
Pan American Games competitors for Colombia
Sportspeople from Boyacá Department
21st-century Colombian people